Pak-Tong may be,

Pak-Tong language
paktong (nickel silver)